Vasse may refer to:

Vasse (Netherlands), a village
Gordon Herbert Vasse (1899–1965), Royal Air Force officer
Thomas Vasse (1774-1801), a French sailor
Vasse, Western Australia, town
Vasse River, in Western Australia
Electoral district of Vasse, in Western Australia

See also
Louis-Claude Vassé, French sculptor